The following is a list of ethnic enclaves in Philippine cities.

Chinese enclaves 

 Binondo, Manila
 Banawe Street, Sta. Mesa Heights, Quezon City
 Greenhills, San Juan City
 Davao City

Korean enclaves 

 Poblacion, Makati
 Angeles City, where Anunas was located along Fil-Am Friendship Highway.

Japanese enclaves 

 Japantown, Makati Philippines at Glorietta Mall
 Japantown, Paco, Manila, Philippines
 Japantown, Iloilo City, Philippines
 Japantown, Cebu City, Philippines
 Japantown, Mandaue City, Philippines
 Japantown, Davao City, Philippines
 Little Tokyo, Davao City, Philippines
 Little Tokyo, Makati, Philippines. This Japanese neighborhood can be found along the stretch of Chino Roces Avenue and neighboring streets in the area approximately between Rufino Street and Arnaiz Avenue.
 Mintal, Barangay in Davao City, Philippines known as Little Tokyo.
 Little Kyoto, Cebu City, Philippines

See also
Demographics of the Philippines
Ethnic groups in the Philippines
Philippine population by country of citizenship

References

External links
 Asian-Nation: Asian American Ethnic Communities & Enclaves
 Diversity and Community: Ethnic Enclaves and Segregation

Philippines
Philippines
Populated places in the Philippines